Emmanuel Nsubuga (born 24 December 1967) is a Ugandan boxer. He competed in the men's flyweight event at the 1988 Summer Olympics.

References

External links
 

1967 births
Living people
Ugandan male boxers
Olympic boxers of Uganda
Boxers at the 1988 Summer Olympics
Place of birth missing (living people)
Flyweight boxers